Ivan Beroš (born 30 December 1979) is a former professional tennis player from Croatia.

Biography
A right-handed player from Makarska, Beroš had a best ranking on tour of 260 in the world. His only ATP Tour main draw appearance came at the 1999 Croatia Open Umag, where featured as a qualifier and was beaten in three sets by Finland's Ville Liukko in the first round. He represented the Croatia Davis Cup team in a 1999 tie against Romania in Bucharest, winning the only Davis Cup match he played, over Gabriel Trifu in what was a dead rubber.

He is a former coach of Mirjana Lučić.

See also
List of Croatia Davis Cup team representatives

References

External links
 
 
 

1979 births
Living people
Croatian male tennis players
Croatian tennis coaches
Sportspeople from Makarska